The Wongo National Park is found in Mali.

The park is located in the south of the country and is primarily dedicated to the conservation of chimpanzees. The climate is temperate, the rainy season lasts from June to October.

References

National parks of Mali
Protected areas established in 2002
2002 establishments in Mali